Interex may refer to:
HP-Interex
The Interex division of Les Mousquetaires